Sylvia is a British musical with book by Kate Prince and Priya Parmer, with music by Josh Cohen and DJ Walde and lyrics by Prince based on the life of Sylvia Pankhurst.

Production history

The Old Vic, London - work in progress (2018) and world premiere (2018) 
The musical was originally co-commissioned by the Old Vic, Sadler's Wells and 14-18 NOW from Kate Prince and her company ZooNation to mark the centenary of the Representation of the People Act 1918 and the end of the First World War. However, it evolved into a full-scale dance, soul, funk and hip hop musical, which was initially presented at The Old Vic as a work-in-progress from 8 to 22 September 2018. A full production of the completed version had its world premiere in 2023, playing at The Old Vic from 27 January to 8 April 2023, with its official opening night on 14 February 2023. Initially scheduled to run until 1 April 2023, the production was extended due to popular demand. 

The main score was written by DJ Walde and Josh Cohen, with additional music by Prince. The work-in-progress 2018 run was mounted by Prince's company ZooNation, with Maria Omakinwa (understudying for Genesis Lynea) as Sylvia, Witney White and Verity Blyth as her sisters Christabel and Adela and Beverley Knight as their mother Emmeline.

The 2023 world premiere production was again directed and choreographed by Kate Prince and stars Beverley Knight, reprising her role as Emmeline Pankhurst, Sharon Rose as the titular character Sylvia and Alex Gaumond as Keir Hardie, founder and first leader of the Labour Party.

Cast and characters

Plot
Starting with a flash-forward to Sylvia's expulsion from the Women's Social and Political Union (WSPU) in 1913, the work returns to Sylvia and Christabel's childhood, their memories of their father Richard's death, the early days of the WSPU, Christabel's relationship with Annie Kenney, the death of Sylvia's brother Frank and particularly Sylvia's close but on-off relationship with Keir Hardie. A sub-plot centres on the political and home life of Winston Churchill, pulled in different directions on the women's suffrage issue by his mother Jennie and his wife Clementine.

The stakes are raised by misogynist threats and police brutality, leading Emmeline, Christabel and Flora Drummond towards a more militant stance. The pacifist Sylvia takes issue with this but still takes part in the ensuing window-breaking, imprisonment and hunger strikes. She also disagrees with their strategic delay in seeking the vote for working-class women and their reactions to Hugh Franklin's attack on Churchill and Emily Davison's death, which Sylvia sees as merely capitalising on them for press attention and public support. Ultimately Sylvia is unable to give the unquestioning loyalty required by Christabel and Emmeline and is expelled from the WSPU, freeing her up to form the East London Federation of Suffragettes in tandem with George Lansbury and lead a delegation of working-class East End women to Parliament.

Sylvia comes close to achieving her goals with the third of the Conciliation Bills - the Prime Minister makes this conditional on an end to militant action, but Sylvia is unable to convince her mother and sister to call such a truce. Keir Hardie resigns his parliamentary seat in protest at the outbreak of World War One and rapidly descends into ill-health, with his wife reluctantly arranging a final meeting between him and Sylvia. Emmeline suspends suffragette activity for the duration of the war and women over 30 are granted the vote in 1918. In the final scene, Sylvia brings the child she has had with her partner Silvio Corio to attempt one final reconciliation with her mother, only to find Emmeline assisting in Christabel's campaign to win a seat - as a Conservative candidate.

Awards

References

Sources

2018 musicals
Biographical musicals
Plays set in the 1900s
Plays set in the 1910s
Plays based on actual events
Rap operas

Women's suffrage in the United Kingdom
Cultural depictions of Winston Churchill
Cultural depictions of activists
Cultural depictions of Emmeline Pankhurst
British musicals
Biographical plays about activists